Filetto marble is a type of beige marble popular for use in sculpture and building decor. It is quarried at the city of North Sinai in the Arish.

Marble